Maryport railway station is a railway station serving the coastal town of Maryport in Cumbria, England. It is owned by Network Rail and managed by Northern Trains. It is unstaffed and passengers must buy their ticket on the train or at an automatic ticket machine outside the platform. Step-free access to the platform is available; train running information is provided by digital information screens and timetable posters.

A new "eco-friendly" waiting shelter was erected at the station in the autumn 2011 (at a cost of £120,000) to replace the more basic facilities previously offered.

The station is somewhat unusual in that it consists of a single bi-directional platform rather than the usual two side platforms used elsewhere on the double-track sections of the Cumbrian Coast line.  Southbound trains have to cross over to the northbound line to reach the platform before returning to the correct line south of the station.  This can cause delays if two trains are scheduled to call in quick succession or if one or more trains are running late.  Network Rail plans to address this issue as part of a future resignalling scheme.

History

Two railway companies originally served the town - the Maryport and Carlisle Railway (M&C), which opened the line to Carlisle in stages between 1840 and 1845, and the Whitehaven Junction Railway which ran southwards to Workington and Whitehaven and opened in 1847.  The latter company was taken over by the London and North Western Railway (LNWR) in 1866, but the M&C remained independent right up until absorption into the LMS in January 1923.

The station is the second to be built in the town, it dates from 1860 and replaced the original 1840 one built by the M&CR for its opening.  The old M&CR headquarters formed part of the substantial station building formerly located here (see photo), but this was demolished in the 1970s.

Service

A few through trains operate to/from  via the Furness Line (four each way in the winter 2022 timetable).

Train operator Northern introduced a regular through Sunday service to Barrow via the coast at the May 2018 timetable change - the first such service south of Whitehaven for more than 40 years.  Services run approximately hourly from mid-morning until early evening, with later trains terminating at Whitehaven.  This represents a major upgrade on the former infrequent service of four per day each way to/from Whitehaven only that previously operated.

In the aftermath of the 2009 Cumbria floods, an additional hourly shuttle service operated southbound stopping at stations to Workington. All services between Workington, Workington North, Flimby and Maryport were free of charge until this service was terminated on 28 May 2010.

Connections

By rail
Trains on the Cumbrian Coast Line run between Carlisle and Whitehaven, but some services go beyond Whitehaven to Barrow-in-Furness, and occasionally Lancaster.

By bus
Several bus routes stop in Maryport and can provide connections for travellers using the railway station. The bus stops on the A596 are only a short walk from the station. The number 60 begins in Maryport and heads north-west up the B5300 to Silloth, calling at Allonby, Mawbray, Beckfoot, and Blitterlees, and provides residents of these smaller settlements with a connection to the station. There are also buses heading north toward Carlisle via Crosby and Aspatria, south toward Workington via Dunmail Park shopping centre, and east toward Cockermouth.

References

External links

 
 

Railway stations in Cumbria
DfT Category F2 stations
Former Maryport and Carlisle Railway stations
Railway stations in Great Britain opened in 1840
Northern franchise railway stations
Maryport